The MAB1 Armored Flame is Michael Angelo Batio's self-designed signature guitar, manufactured by Dean in 2007.

History
Two USA-built prototypes of the MAB1 AF were first designed and produced for Batio in 2007. He started to use them in June, 2007 at clinics and live shows, before it was mass-produced and available to pre-order in 2008 after making their debut at NAMM. These first two prototype models differed from the production model in the volume and tone pot configuration. The first batch were issued by Dean in July 2008, and Batio personally autographed and numbered the first 100 on July 14 at the Dean headquarters in Tampa, Florida. The MAB1 was not fitted with Batio's signature "Hands Without Shadows" pickup, as production of the guitar had already begun before it was completed.

References

External links
Michael Angelo Batio official site
Dean Guitars official site
Michael Angelo Batio official forum

Dean guitars